Giuseppe Apolloni (8 April 1822 – 31 December 1889) was an Italian composer born in Vicenza, Italy. He composed a total of five operas, of which only one L'ebreo was successful. He died in Vicenza.

References

1822 births
1889 deaths
19th-century classical composers
19th-century Italian male musicians
Italian classical composers
Italian male classical composers
Italian opera composers
Italian Romantic composers
Male opera composers
People from Vicenza